Siedlce railway station is a railway station in Siedlce, Poland. As of 2011, it is served by Koleje Mazowieckie (which runs the KM2 services from Warszawa Zachodnia to Łuków and KM31 services from Siedlce to Czeremcha), Przewozy Regionalne (InterRegio services between Łuków and Bielsko Biała Główna), and PKP Intercity. The station was opened in 1866.

References
Station article at kolej.one.pl

External links 
 

Railway stations in Poland opened in 1866
Railway stations in Masovian Voivodeship
Railway stations served by Koleje Mazowieckie
Railway stations served by Przewozy Regionalne InterRegio
Railway station
1866 establishments in the Russian Empire
Buildings and structures in Masovian Voivodeship